Morten Gundro Adamsen (born 10 September 1981) is a Norwegian competition rower. He was born in Drammen and represented Drammens RK. He competed at the 2004 Summer Olympics in Athens, where he placed seventh in double sculls, together with Nils-Torolv Simonsen.

References

External links

Norwegian male rowers
1981 births
Living people
Sportspeople from Drammen
Rowers at the 2004 Summer Olympics
Olympic rowers of Norway